Ariel Behar and Horacio Zeballos were the defending champions but decided not to participate.
Marcelo Demoliner and Franko Škugor won the final 7–6(10–8), 6–2 against Sergio Galdós and Marco Trungelliti.

Seeds

Draw

Draw

References
 Main Draw

Seguros Bolivar Open Bucaramanga - Doubles
2013 Doubles